An-Nazla ash-Sharqiya is a Palestinian village in the Tulkarm Governorate in the eastern West Bank, located 18 kilometers North-east of Tulkarm.

In 1882, the PEF's Survey of Western Palestine described Nuzlet ash Sherkiyeh as "a small hamlet, with a well to the south, and a few olives. It stands on high ground, and has a palm tree near."

British Mandate era 
In the 1931 census of Palestine, conducted by the British Mandate authorities, Nazla ash Sharqiya had a population of 256 Muslims, in a total of 52 houses.

In the 1945 statistics the population of Nazla esh Sharqiya was 300 Muslims, with 4,840 dunams of land according to an official land and population survey. Of this, 723 dunams were plantations and irrigable land, 268 were used for cereals, while 5 dunams were built-up (urban) land.

Jordanian era 
In the wake of the 1948 Arab–Israeli War, and after the 1949 Armistice Agreements, An-Nazla ash-Sharqiya came under Jordanian rule. It was annexed by Jordan in 1950.

In 1961, the population of Nazla Sharqiya was 507.

Post 1967 
Since the Six-Day War in 1967, An-Nazla ash-Sharqiya has been under Israeli occupation.

According to the Palestinian Central Bureau of Statistics, an-Nazla ash-Sharqiya had a population of approximately 1,647 inhabitants in mid-year 2006. 5.4% of the population of an-Nazla ash-Sharqiya were refugees in 1997. The healthcare facilities for an-Nazla ash-Sharqiya and the villagers of an-Nazla al Wusta are based in an-Nazla ash-Sharqiya, where the facilities are designated as MOH level 2.

References

Bibliography

External links
Welcome To al-Nazla al-Sharqiya
Survey of Western Palestine, Map 11:  IAA, Wikimedia commons

Villages in the West Bank
Tulkarm Governorate
Municipalities of the State of Palestine